The 1922–23 season was the 50th season of competitive football in Scotland and the 33rd season of the Scottish Football League.

Scottish League Division One 

Champions: Rangers
Relegated: Albion Rovers, Alloa Athletic

Scottish League Division Two 

Promoted: Queen's Park, Clydebank

Scottish Cup 

Celtic were winners of the Scottish Cup after a 1–0 over Hibernian.

Other honours

National

County 

. *replay

Highland League

Junior Cup 
Musselburgh Bruntonians were winners of the Junior Cup after a 2–0 win over Arniston in the final.

Scotland national team 

Scotland were winners of the 1922–23 British Home Championship.

Key:
 (H) = Home match
 (A) = Away match
 BHC = British Home Championship

See also 
 1922–23 Aberdeen F.C. season
 Lord Provost's Rent Relief Cup

Notes and references

External links 
Scottish Football Historical Archive

 
Seasons in Scottish football